The 12033 / 12034 Kanpur–New Delhi Shatabdi Express is the Shatabdi train connecting  with . Due to the excessive passenger load on Lucknow Shatabdi from Kanpur Central and huge demand for a separate Shatabdi train from Kanpur Central, the Railway Ministry declared the new Shatabdi train from Central Station in 2009 Railway Budget. This train was flagged off by Union Railways minister Mamata Banerjee on 7 Feb 2010. It runs on all days of a week except Sunday.

In its initial days, it used to run non-stop between Kanpur and New Delhi.

It is called Kanpur Reverse Shatabdi because it follows the reverse timetable of Lucknow Shatabdi; i.e. UP follows DOWN time table and vice versa.

Halts

12033 

Running days: 'MON TUE WED THU FRI SAT'

12034 

Running days: 'MON TUE WED THU FRI SAT' 

Note: In return it doesn't stop at Aligarh Junction railway station

Fares and coaches

These fares are lesser as compared to the Lucknow Swarn Shatabdi Express for the same pair of stations. Morning/evening snacks, tea and coffee are served.

Loco Link

Ghaziabad / Kanpur-based WAP-7 (HOG)-equipped locomotive are used to haul the train for its entire journey.

See also 
Lucknow Swarna Shatabdi
Shram Shakti Express
Express trains in India
Dedicated Intercity trains of India

References 

Trains from Kanpur
Transport in Delhi
Shatabdi Express trains
Rail transport in Delhi